The 2008 Atlantic 10 men's basketball tournament was played at Boardwalk Hall in Atlantic City, New Jersey from March 12 to March 15, 2008. By winning the tournament, Temple received an automatic bid to the 2008 NCAA Men's Division I Basketball Tournament and was crowned Atlantic 10 Conference champion. Xavier and Saint Joseph's also received at-large bids to the NCAA tournament. Dionte Christmas of Temple was named the tournament's Most Outstanding Player.

Seeding
The seeding for the tournament is based on regular-season record during Atlantic 10 Conference play. Each team played a 16-game schedule.  Charlotte, Richmond, and Saint Joseph's all finished with records of 9-7. Richmond won the tiebreaker by having a 2-1 record among the tied schools. Saint Joseph's came second from the tiebreaker with a record of 1-1. Also, La Salle and Dayton both finished with 8-8 records. La Salle won the tiebreaker by beating Dayton during the regular season. Lastly, Duquesne, Rhode Island, and Saint Louis all finished with records of 7-9. Since the teams were all 1-1 in games amongst each other, the tie was broken by record against the highest-ranked teams in the conference. In the end, Saint Louis won the tiebreaker as a result of a 1-1 record vs. Massachusetts. Duquesne (0-1 vs. Massachusetts) then got the tiebreaker over Rhode Island (0-2).

The top four teams receive byes to the second round of the tournament.  Because they did not finish in the top 12 in the Atlantic 10, George Washington and St. Bonaventure did not qualify for the tournament.

Bracket

Asterisk denotes game ended in overtime.

References

Atlantic 10 men's basketball tournament
Tournament
Atlantic 10 men's basketball tournament
Atlantic 10 men's basketball tournament